Latin America is home to some of the few countries of the world with a complete ban on abortion, without an exception for saving maternal life.

Current strategies

International Conference on Population and Development (ICPD) 
The 1994 International Conference on Population and Development defined reproductive health as noted above. It also defined strategies and goals for advancing such reproductive health and rights in Latin America through what is called the Cairo Programme of Action (CPA). The CPA has three quantitative targets: (1) Reducing overall mortality, which implies an increase in life expectancy, reducing specific mortalities (2) Universal access to education, especially for girls (3) Universal access to reproductive health services, including family planning.  Adopted by the region at the conference, some improvements have been seen since the adoption of the CPA. Reproductive rights have become recognized in the constitutions of Bolivia, Ecuador and Venezuela.

Millennium Development Goals in Latin America 
The Millennium Development Goals are a descriptive framework by which to monitor response to eight specific goals. They were announced in the Millennium Declaration in September 2000. Whether or not a country is on track to meeting these goals—in the case of Latin America—is tracked by the Economic Commission for Latin America and the Caribbean (ECLAC). One particular goal in regard to reproductive health, Goal 5, seeks to improve maternal health within the region.  The first target of Goal 5 is to reduce the maternal mortality ratio by three quarters between 1990 and 2015. In order to assess the progress towards this goal, ECLAC monitors maternal mortality ratios and the proportion of births attended by skilled health personnel. The second target of Goal 5 is to achieve universal access to reproductive health by 2015. This target is assessed by viewing contraceptive prevalence rates, adolescent birth rates, antenatal care coverage and percentages of unmet need for family planning. In order to achieve these goals, many actions have been taken, including the growing institutionalization of deliveries and the increased number of personnel trained to provide care during childbirth and emergency obstetric care.

Adolescent maternity and reproductive health 
Protecting the health of adolescents is an important public health priority. Increased investment in adolescent reproductive health contributes to improving the overall status of women as well as the reduction in poverty among families. Adolescent health must be contextualized within reproductive health and thus public health. Latin American government as a whole did not recognize early pregnancy in adolescents to be an issue until 1984 during the International Conference on Population in Mexico City.

In Latin America, 38% of women become pregnant before the age of 20 and almost 20% of births are to teenage mothers. While an overall universal trend towards earlier average age of menstruation can be seen, the mean age of marriage has declined. This implies that adolescents who are coerced into marriage are unprotected in terms of reproductive rights for longer periods of time.

According to the UN Population Fund, education and access to information and services young people need in order to make responsible decisions remains insufficient. The importance of education is exemplified by how girls in Latin America who have completed only up to primary education or less have a higher probability of adolescent pregnancy. Further, many young girls are dying because their bodies cannot support pregnancies. The same fund reports that the risk of complications during pregnancy and delivery for girls aged 15 to 19 is double the rate for women in their 20s, and five times as high for girls under 15. 
Research reveals that there are several major barriers that young people face to accessing contraception, primarily with acquiring services. For example, facilities are frequently in areas inaccessible to young individuals. Due to a lack of information, adolescents often incorrectly use or do not use contraceptives at all. For the purpose of privacy from their communities and families, young persons often seek services from facilities not located directly in their own neighborhoods.

There is also a swath of data that is not collected by hospitals on abortions that are particularly "clandestine" / "backstreet". Studies have shown that in several Latin American countries, young single women are at a high risk for abortion which is not reflected by the number of married, older women who were hospitalized for abortions.

Contraceptives 

Use of modern contraceptives has increased to 62.5% (CITE: Population action) giving the region as a whole the highest contraceptive prevalence rate in the developing world. The increased uptake of sexual and reproductive health and family planning services has resulted in a marked drop in total fertility rates from approximately 4.6 children per woman in the 1970s to about 2.5 in 2013. 
In Latin America, multiple court decisions have granted personhood to fertilized eggs. These court decisions have been responsible for the extreme restrictions on access to emergency contraception within the region. 
The legal status of oral contraception in Latin America varies by country. In 2009 Honduras banned the free distribution and sale of emergency contraceptives That same year, the Constitutional Court of Peru ordered the Health Ministry to refrain from distributing emergency contraceptives to the public sector. In Costa Rica, where emergency contraceptives are not blatantly prohibited, the popular emergency contraceptive levonorgestrel is not registered as a product, which impedes access to the drug from within the public health system as well as the private market.  
Although the remaining countries in the region allow for the free distribution of emergency contraceptives, they do not have uniform regulations. In Chile, Colombia and Ecuador, the right to have access to emergency contraceptives is recognized. In Nicaragua and Bolivia, the protocols of their respective health ministries are essentially law. In Argentina and Brazil, the distribution of emergency contraceptives is not legally recognized except in protocols and informative guides.

Abortion 

Abortion is a highly controversial aspect of reproductive rights. While every country in Latin America has differing laws and regulations regarding abortion, the general sentiment is that of disapproval. Abortions in Latin America have had a history of being unsafe and illegal (especially for poor women), with recent improvements in both of those areas. Most of these improvements can be attributed to modern contraception, emergency care, as well as education. Similarly, advocacy and national conflict has grown surrounding abortion rights in Latin America. The region has seen a steady increase of feminist abortion activists, despite religion making the issue taboo.

According to the World Health Organization, in 2008, approximately "4.2 million abortions were conducted in Latin America and the Caribbean, almost three-fourths of them in South America. Virtually all these procedures were illegal and many were unsafe."

In 2011, the number of unsafe abortions in Latin America rose to 4.2 million annually. Unsafe abortions account for a large proportion of maternal deaths. For example, in Argentina unsafe abortions account for 31% of the maternal mortality rate.

In Latin America abortion is:
completely prohibited: El Salvador, Dominican Republic, Nicaragua, Honduras
allowed only to save the mother's life: Guatemala, Paraguay, Venezuela,
allowed only to save the mother's life and in case of rape: Brazil 
allowed only to save the mother's life or health: Costa Rica, Peru, Ecuador (and rape of disabled women)
allowed only to save the mother's life and in case of rape or fetal malformation: Chile (since 2017), Panama
allowed only to save the mother's life or health, and in case of rape: Bolivia
allowed on request: Argentina, Colombia, Cuba, Guyana, Uruguay, and some states of Mexico (Mexico City and Oaxaca)

Strict abortion laws are accompanied by strict punishments. In El Salvador, for example, a woman can be jailed for up to 40 years for aborting while in Mexico, she could be jailed for up to 50 years. These punishments do not take into consideration the cause of the pregnancy, due to the fact that many of the imprisoned women were raped or had involuntary abortions

International legislations also have an effect on abortion rights in Latin America. When U.S. President Donald Trump reinstated the Global Gag Rule on January 23, 2017, he prohibited all U.S. federal money from funding international organizations such as NGOs that "perform or actively promote abortion as a method of family planning".

On 7 September 2020, women rights activists across Latin America battled to guarantee the access to safe abortion during COVID-19. For decades, rights defenders in Latin America were fighting an uphill battle to ensure sexual and reproductive rights. Abortion in Argentina was legalised on 29 December 2020; Cuba legalised it in 1965, Guyana in 1995, Uruguay in 2012. French Guiana, as part of France, legalised abortion in 1975. The Caribbean Netherlands (Bonaire, Eustatius and Saba) legalised abortion on 10 October 2011, shortly after their incorporation into the Netherlands in 2010. Abortion in Sint Maarten remains illegal except to save a mother's life. Abortion is also illegal on Curaçao, but officially tolerated since 1999, and there are no known cases of women having been prosecuted for having an abortion performed.

Comprehensive sex education 

In 2008, the region adopted "Miniseria Declaration, 'Prevention through Education,'" in response to a lack of comprehensive sexuality education. While there have been some setbacks and delays regarding implementation, there have also been key improvements.

Religious influences 

Religion in Latin America is characterized by the predominance of Roman Catholicism, although there is also increasing Protestant influence (especially in Central America and Brazil) as well as by the presence of other world religions. Critics of the restrictive abortion laws of Latin America argue that this situation is created by the strong influence of  the Catholic church in the region. El Salvador and Nicaragua have drawn international attention for strong enforcement of their complete bans on abortion. In 2017, Chile relaxed its total ban, allowing abortion to be performed when the woman's life is in danger, when a fetus is unviable, or in cases of rape.

See also 
 Reproductive rights in Brazil
 Healthcare in Nicaragua

References 

Reproductive rights
Health in South America